Edgar Stewart Fay QC (8 October 1908 – 14 November 2009) was a British judge.  He was the son of Sir Sam Fay, General Manager of the Great Central Railway and was educated at McGill University, and Pembroke College, Cambridge.  He conducted inquiries into the collapse of the Crown Agents and the Munich air crash.

References

1908 births
2009 deaths
Alumni of Pembroke College, Cambridge
Men centenarians
British centenarians
20th-century English judges
McGill University alumni
English King's Counsel